Zagacie may refer to the following places:
Zagacie, Lesser Poland Voivodeship (south Poland)
Zagacie, Łódź Voivodeship (central Poland)
Zagacie, Lublin Voivodeship (east Poland)
Zagacie, Silesian Voivodeship (south Poland)